"'Just Get Up and Close the Door" is a song written by Linda Hargrove, and recorded by Johnny Rodriguez.  It was released in April 1975 as the first single and title track from the album Just Get Up and Close the Door.  The song was Rodriguez's fifth number one on the country chart.  The single stayed at number one for one week and spent a total of ten weeks on the chart.

Charts

Weekly charts

Year-end charts

References

1975 singles
Johnny Rodriguez songs
Songs written by Linda Hargrove
Song recordings produced by Jerry Kennedy
Mercury Records singles
1975 songs